Khyati is one of the 24 daughters of Daksha, born to his wife Prasuti. Her father is regarded to have another 62 from his wife Panchajani (Virini). One of his daughters is called Khyati, who is married to the sage Bhrigu. Khyati bears her husband two sons, Dhata and Vidhata, as well as a daughter, Lakshmi.

References 

Nature gods in Hinduism
Hindu goddesses
Daughters of Daksha
Hindu mythology